Yūichi, Yuichi, or Yuuichi is a masculine Japanese given name.

Possible writings
Yūichi can be written using different combinations of kanji characters. Here are some examples:

勇一, "courage, 1"
祐一, "to help, 1"
祐市, "to help, city"
佑一, "to help, 1"
佑市, "to help, city"
裕一, "abundant, 1"
裕市, "abundant, city"
雄一, "male, 1"
友一, "friend, 1"
悠一, "long time, 1"
悠市, "long time, city"
優一, "superiority, 1"
有一, "to have, 1"
邑一, "village, 1"

The name can also be written in hiragana ゆういち or katakana ユウイチ.

Yuichi is a separate given name.

諭一, "to persuade, 1"
愉一, "pleased, 1"
愈一, "more and more, 1"

And can also be written in hiragana ゆいち or katakana ユイチ.

Notable people with the name

, Japanese short track speed skater
, Japanese jockey
, Japanese footballer
, Japanese baseball player
, Japanese tennis player
, Japanese video director
, Japanese football player
, Brazilian baseball player
, Japanese football player
, Japanese former volleyball player
, member of the boy band KAT-TUN
, Japanese actor
, Japanese voice actor
, Japanese football player
, Japanese football referee
, Japanese politician of the Liberal Democratic Party
, Japanese cross-country skier
, Japanese science fiction writer
, Japanese football player
, Japanese novelist
, Japanese author
, Japanese shogi player
, Japanese actor and full-time member of the 4-man theatre troupe 
, Japanese football player
, Japanese painter

Fictional characters
, character in Kanon
, character in My-HiME and My-Otome
, character in Sakura Wars
, character in Paranoia Agent
Yuichi Beelzebub, character in Yondemasuyo, Azazel-san
, character in World Trigger
, from Inazuma Eleven GO.

Japanese masculine given names